The 1961–62 NBA season was the Nationals' 13th season in the history NBA.

Regular season

Season standings

x – clinched playoff spot

Record vs. opponents

Game log

Playoffs

|- align="center" bgcolor="#ffcccc" 
| 1
| March 16
| @ Philadelphia
| L 103–110
| Larry Costello (23)
| Red Kerr (15)
| Bianchi, Shaffer (4)
| Philadelphia Civic Center6,937
| 0–1
|- align="center" bgcolor="#ffcccc" 
| 2
| March 18
| Philadelphia
| L 82–97
| Red Kerr (18)
| Lee Shaffer (13)
| Larry Costello (5)
| Onondaga War Memorial5,250
| 0–2
|- align="center" bgcolor="#ccffcc" 
| 3
| March 19
| @ Philadelphia
| W 101–100
| Lee Shaffer (30)
| Red Kerr (16)
| Larry Costello (10)
| Philadelphia Civic Center5,328
| 1–2
|- align="center" bgcolor="#ccffcc" 
| 4
| March 20
| Philadelphia
| W 106–99
| Red Kerr (27)
| Red Kerr (22)
| Larry Costello (7)
| Onondaga War Memorial
| 2–2
|- align="center" bgcolor="#ffcccc" 
| 5
| March 22
| @ Philadelphia
| L 104–121
| Lee Shaffer (30)
| Red Kerr (15)
| Al Bianchi (5)
| Philadelphia Civic Center7,829
| 2–3
|-

References

Philadelphia 76ers seasons
Syracuse
Syracuse
Syracuse